BILLA is an Austrian supermarket chain that operates in Central, Eastern and Southeastern Europe. The company was founded by Karl Wlaschek in 1953. He sold his controlling interest to Germany's REWE Group in 1996.

History
In 1953, Karl Wlaschek opened a discount perfume shop in the Vienna district of Margareten called WKW (Warenhandel Karl Wlaschek, translatable as Karl Wlaschek Trading). By 1960 WKW had 45 stores in Austria. In 1961 the chain was renamed Billa, a portmanteau of "billiger Laden", German for 'cheap shop', started selling food and went over to self-service. In 1965 the company had grown to 109 stores. REWE Group acquired Billa in 1996.

Present locations
Billa operates stores in four European countries:

Austria
Austria is the chain's home market. As of March 2019 Billa had 1,069 stores in the country, second only to SPAR's 1,538.

Czech Republic
The first Billa supermarket in the Czech Republic was opened in Stránského Street, Brno, on 26 October 1991. The company has 215 stores in the country and employs over 6,000 staff. Billa stores have an average sales area of 900 m2.

Slovakia
Billa opened its first store in Slovakia in 1993.

Bulgaria
The company opened its first supermarket in Bulgaria in 2000 and has since then expanded to cover 44 Bulgarian cities, operating a total of 145 supermarkets as of July 2022.

Former locations
Billa operated in other countries in the past.

Russia
The first Billa supermarket in Russia opened in 2004. In 2008, the network for the first time went outside of Moscow. In the same year, thirteen Yum-Yum supermarkets in Moscow were purchased.

In 2012, Billa bought the Russian supermarket chain Citistor (part of the former Ramstor chain). 

Since 2008, all new Rewe Group stores in Russia in the "supermarket" format have been opened not under the Billa brand, but under the Biop (Billa Operations) brand. The reason is that only Billa Russia LLC had the right to develop the Billa brand in Russia, but one of the partners (22.5 %) — the Russian holding "Marta" - since the end of 2008 stopped investing in the development of the company due to the beginning of the bankruptcy procedure. In June 2010, this package was purchased from "Marta".

On January 27, 2011, the official renaming of all the stores of the Biop chain to the Bill stores took place In 2018, 151 Billa stores were opened in Russia. In 2021, before the deal with Lenta, there were 161 stores operating across Russia mostly in Moscow and surrounding cities. The holding company Lenta LLC announced on May 18 that it had struck a deal to acquire the supermarkets business of Billa Russia GmbH for 215 millions € in cash.

Ukraine 
The first BILLA supermarket in Ukraine was opened on February 3, 2000 in Kyiv. Over the next 14 years, the company developed actively — in 2014, the number of its stores reached 39. BILLA supermarkets were represented in 16 cities in 9 regions of the country.

Since 2015, the number of supermarkets has started to decrease. In June 2017, the company announced the sale of 9 of its stores in the regions at once. As of September 2017, the chain of supermarkets of the Austrian concern has decreased to 17 supermarkets, of which 12 were in Kyiv and the Kyiv region, two each in Dnipro and Odesa, and 1 in Zhytomyr.

In March 2019, there were 30 BILLA supermarkets in Ukraine.

On September 16, 2020, it became known that the Austrian company "Rewe International AG" sold the Ukrainian chain of supermarkets to the Lithuanian company, the founder of Novus Ukraine LLC, Consul Trade House UAB.

See also
List of supermarkets 
Selgros
XXL

References

External links

 Billa Austria
 Billa Bulgaria
 Billa Czech Republic
 Billa Russia
 Billa Slovakia
 Billa Ukraine 

Austrian companies established in 1953
Austrian brands
Convenience stores
Defunct retail companies of Romania
Retail companies established in 1953
Supermarkets of Austria
Supermarkets of Bulgaria
Supermarkets of Croatia
Supermarkets of the Czech Republic
Supermarkets of Ukraine
Economy of Lower Austria